Chicago Books to Women in Prison (CBWP) is an all volunteer based non-profit organization that provides used books to educate incarcerated women. The current president of CBWP is Vicki White, who overlooks volunteers and the organization. CBWP is a Chicago based organization currently working in the basement of Ravenswood Fellowship United Methodist Church. The basement of this church holds a collection of over 8,000 books dedicated to be sent to women in correctional institutions in over 40 states.

History 
The CBWP was founded in 2002 and sent over 20,000 books to women in prison by 2018. The organization was started by a group of book enthusiasts and archivists, including Jack Slowriver, Jodi Ziesemer, Nicole Bussard, and Arline Welty. It began as a feminist project operating out of a room in the Haymarket Co-op. CBWP's prison model of inspiration came from the Women’s Prison Book Project in Minneapolis, founded in 1994. This was the only group at the time sending books to inmates, but now both organizations have split up the states in the U.S. Many prison book collections have depreciated since the Lewis v. Casey rule in 1990 which states that prisoners do not hold the right to a law library. CPWB helps prison inmates whose prisons lack the resources for a wide-ranging library.

Funding 
CBWP sends out donations to incarcerated women free of charge and CPWB relies mostly on donations and volunteers to assist in running the organization. CBWP matches requests from incarcerated women and sends out three books with a note from a volunteer. On average, the group sends around 3,000 packages per year. In 2017, CBWP donated 4,690 packages averaging up to a total of about 12,000 books. CBWP has a yearly budget of $15,000 made up of the general funding from donations and grants to the non-profit.

Partnerships 

 CBWP had a partnership with an organization called Beyondmedia Education but financial troubles led them to rent out their previous 650-square foot Lakeview storefront. They still reside in their Ravenswood location, but are no longer associated with Beyondmedia Education.
 In October 2017, CBWP had also partnered with local bookstore Bookends & Beginnings for a book drive and aimed to collect up to 200 books.

Book requests 
When prisoners receive their bundle of three books, they also receive an order form to fill out for more books. Many of the books donated do not meet the requests of prisoners. The most widely requested books are dictionaries and composition books. Many prisons do not give the donated composition books to the inmates because they want them to purchase the composition books from the prison instead. The CBWP volunteers send poetry books instead of journals and write notes to the prisoners telling them to write their thoughts on the margins. Another type of frequently requested books are coloring books. CBWP sends around 500 to 600 coloring books a year.  80% of the prisoners are mothers and they are also in need of books about parenting while in prison. Although these prisoners receive new books every 3 to 5 months, frequently they end up sharing many of these book donations with their cellmates.

Expansion 
In addition to women's prison, CBWP sends books to the Cook County Jail as well as transgender women housed in about 20 men's facilities. The organization has expanded throughout the years and now handouts, books to prisons in Illinois, Indiana, Ohio, Missouri, Kentucky, Florida, New Hampshire, California, and Connecticut. CBWP prison volunteers meet every Sunday from 2:00 p.m. to 5:00 p.m. at Ravenswood Fellowship United Methodist Church.

References

External links 

 Ravenswood Fellowship United Methodist Church

2002 establishments in Illinois
Non-profit organizations based in Chicago
Women in Chicago